A list of happenings in 2011 in Kenya:

Incumbents
President: Mwai Kibaki
Vice-President: Kalonzo Musyoka
Chief Justice: Johnson Gicheru then Willy Mutunga

Events

January 
January 1–10 people die when a bus veers off-road in Ngarariga, near Nairobi
January 4 - A delegation led by Kenyan Prime Minister Raila Odinga fails to solve the 2010–2011 Ivorian crisis
January 4 - The Minister of Industrialisation Henry Kosgey gives up his cabinet post. Kosgey is subject to corruption investigations and also is one of six Kenyans charged by the International Criminal Court
January 27 - Simon Mbugua of PNU loses his Kamukunji Constituency parliamentary seat as the 2007 election result was annulled by a court in January 2011 
January 31 - The Commission on the Implementation of Constitution declares unconstitutional the recent naming of Chief Justice and other top juridical posts by the President Mwai Kibaki

February 
February 9 - Ten people die as a bus collides with a truck in Sachangwan along the Nakuru-Eldoret highway 
February 12 - Nine people die as a matatu and a bus collide at the Matunda bridge along the Kitale-Webuye road.
February 16 - Joseph Gitari of PNU won the Kirinyaga Central Constituency parliamentary by-election 
February 18 - Bonny Khalwale of New Ford Kenya loses his Ikolomani Constituency parliamentary seat as the High Court cites electoral malpractice in the 2007 election

March 
March - Thousands of residents flee Mandera town as fighting between Somali militia escalates in the area 
March 9 - The International Criminal Court summons six previously named Kenyans to appear at the court in the Hague on April 7, 2011. Meanwhile, a faction of Kenyan government, including President Mwai Kibaki and Vice President Kalonzo Musyoka are calling for ICC to drop the cases. See also: International Criminal Court investigation in Kenya

September 
September 12 - Over 100 people die in a pipeline fire in Sinai slum, Nairobi

October 

 October 16 - Kenyan Defense Forces enter southern Somalia as part of Operation Linda Nchi. The KDF intervened to provide a buffer between terrorist group Al-Shaabab and the Kenyan Border. The forces remain in Kenya until 31 May 2012.

Deaths

January - March 
January 1 - Lessa Lassan, musician,
January 6 - Duncan Nyamari (aka Alfayo), 25, actor of Mheshimiwa drama series, shot dead 
March 12 - Paul Kiptoo arap Koech, politician 
March 15 - Musa Juma, 42, musician, pneumonia

April - June 
May 16 - Samuel Wanjiru, 24, Olympic gold medal-winning marathon runner, fall from balcony.

July - September 
July 31 - Habel Kifoto. musician, bandleader of Maroon Commandos, suspected heart failure 
September 25 - Margaret Ogola, 53, writer 
September 25 - Wangari Maathai - 71, Environmental and human rights activist, Nobel Peace Prize laureate (2004), cancer

Sports

January - March 
February 12 - Kenya Harlequins retains the Kenya Cup rugby title 
February 18 - Mary Keitany sets a new World Half marathon record at the Ras Al Khaimah Half Marathon (time 1:05:50 hours) 
February 19-March 20 - Kenya participated the 2011 Cricket World Cup in, but lost all their six matches
February 20 - The 2010 FKL Cup winners Sofapaka beats league champions Ulinzi Stars 1-0 to retain the Kenya Supercup
March 6 - Kenya wins all categories at the 2011 African Cross Country Championships in Cape Town, South Africa.  John Mwangangi and Mercy Cherono won the men's and women's titles, respectively

April - June

July - September 
September 25 - Patrick Makau wins Berlin Marathon setting a new marathon World record. Florence Kiplagat won the Women's race.

References 

 
Years of the 21st century in Kenya
2010s in Kenya
Kenya
Kenya